The Kehlen is a mountain in the Swabian Jura near Gosheim in the county of Tuttlingen. It belongs to the Region of the 10 Thousanders. Its summit lies directly on the Albtrauf and offers a view of the plain and the Black Forest. It is 1,001 metres high.

References

External links 

One-thousanders of Germany
Mountains and hills of Baden-Württemberg
Mountains and hills of the Swabian Jura
Tuttlingen (district)